Alexis Thébaux (born 17 March 1985, Les Sables d'Olonne) is a French professional footballer who plays as a goalkeeper for Championnat National 2 club Thonon Evian.

Career 
Thébaux started his career at Nantes in 2001 at the age of 16. In the summer transfer window of 2012, he moved to Brest as a replacement for Steeve Elana, who had departed that transfer window for Lille.

Honours 
Thonon Evian

 Championnat National 3: 2021–22
 Régional 1 Auvergne-Rhône-Alpes: 2019–20
 Régional 2 Auvergne-Rhône-Alpes: 2018–19

Notes

References

External links
 
 

1985 births
Living people
People from Les Sables-d'Olonne
Association football goalkeepers
Sportspeople from Vendée
French footballers
France under-21 international footballers
France youth international footballers
Stade Malherbe Caen players
AS Cherbourg Football players
Dijon FCO players
FC Nantes players
Stade Brestois 29 players
Thonon Evian Grand Genève F.C. players
Championnat National players
Ligue 1 players
Ligue 2 players
Championnat National 3 players
Régional 1 players
Footballers from Pays de la Loire